Pregnanetriol, or 5β-pregnane-3α,17α,20α-triol, is a steroid and inactive metabolite of progesterone.

Urine testing
Urine excretion of pregnanetriol can be measured over a period of 24 hours. Elevated urine pregnanetriol levels suggest adrenogenital syndrome. In monitoring treatment with cortisol replacement, elevated urine pregnanetriol levels indicate insufficient dosage of cortisol.

Reference ranges
For females:

 0 to 5 years: < 0.1 mg/24 hours
 6 to 9 years: < 0.3 mg/24 hours
 10 to 15 years: 0.1 to 0.6 mg/24 hours
 16 years and older: 0 to 1.4 mg/ 24 hours.

For males:

 0 to 5 years: < 0.1 mg/24 hours
 6 to 9 years: < 0.3 mg/24 hours
 10 to 15 years: 0.2 to 0.6 mg/24 hours
 16 years and older: 0.2 to 2 mg/ 24 hours

See also
Pregnanetriolone

References

5β-Pregnanes
Human metabolites